Sven Helge Lien (born 4 August 1958) is a Norwegian former ice hockey player. He was born in Drøbak and played for the club Furuset IF. He played for the Norwegian national ice hockey team at the 1984 Winter Olympics.

See also

References

External links

1958 births
Living people
People from Frogn
Norwegian ice hockey players
Olympic ice hockey players of Norway
Ice hockey players at the 1984 Winter Olympics
Sportspeople from Viken (county)